Gline Arley Clarke (born 9 February 1951) is a Barbadian politician and teacher. He was a member of parliament in the House of Assembly of Barbados. Clarke is the Barbados Ambassador to Canada since September 2020.

Early life 
Clarke was born on 9 February 1951 in Newbury, St. George, Barbados. He attended University of the West Indies where he studied and graduated. In 1974 he secured his degree in Social Science and Political Science.

Career 
Clarke began his career as a teacher, teaching in 1970 at the St. Jude's Primary in Barbados. After teaching for ten years, in 1983 he was appointed vice counsel and liaison officer at the Barbados High Commission in Canada where he served till 1987. On his return to Barbados in 1991, he briefly worked with former Prime Minister Owen Arthur till 1994. In 1994, he was elected to the Barbados Parliament where he worked as Parliamentary Secretary in the Ministry of Housing and Public Works. In 1999, he was re-elected Minister of Housing and Lands until 2003, and subsequently re-elected as Minister of Public Works and Transport from 2003 to 2008.

In 2013, Clarke was re-elected to the Barbados House of Assembly in the 2013 general election. He held his seat in the 2018 general election and was appointed as the Deputy Speaker in the 2018.  On September 21, 2020 Clarke resigned as member of Parliament after he was appointed Barbados Ambassador to Canada. He resumed his position in Ottawa in July 2021, several months after his appointment.

References 

Members of the House of Assembly of Barbados
1951 births
University of the West Indies alumni
High Commissioners of Barbados to Canada
Barbados Labour Party politicians
Living people